The 2022 Asia Rugby Sevens Series was the thirteenth edition of Asia's continental sevens circuit. The lower-tier Trophy tournament, hosted in Indonesia, served as a qualifier, with the top team qualifying for the main series hosted in Thailand, South Korea, and UAE.

The Asia Rugby Sevens Series issued an apology after the wrong national anthem was played for the Hong Kong Men's 7's team before the final.

Teams

Asia Rugby Sevens Trophy

 
 
 
 
 
  
  
 
 
 
 
 

Asia Rugby Sevens Series

Schedule
 
The official schedules and venues for the 2022 Asia Rugby Sevens Trophy & Asia Rugby Sevens Series were:

Trophy
The Trophy was held from 6 to 7 August at the JGBK Rugby Pitch in Jakarta.

Placings

Pool stage

Pool A

Pool B

Pool C

Pool D

9th place play-off

Knockout stage

5th–8th bracket

Cup playoffs

Series standings
Final standings over the three legs of the 2019 Asia Rugby Sevens Series:

Bangkok 
The Thailand leg of the series was held from 22 to 23 October at the Boonyachinda Stadium in Bangkok.
Sri Lanka was suspended from participating in this tournament.

Pool stage

Pool A

Pool B

Knockout stage

Plate bracket

Cup playoffs

Incheon
The Korean leg of the series was held from 12 to 13 November in Incheon.

Pool stage

Pool A

Pool B

Knockout stage

Plate playoffs

Cup playoffs

Al Ain
The Korean leg of the series was held from 26 to 27 November in Al Ain.

Pool stage

Pool A

Pool B

Knockout stage

Plate playoffs

Cup playoffs

Incidents
A national anthem mix-up incident happened on 13 November. "Glory to Hong Kong" was played instead of "March of the Volunteers" as the national anthem of Hong Kong during a rugby match in Incheon, between the Hong Kong and South Korea rugby teams. Asia Rugby has apologised and explained that it was down to "simple human error" made by a junior member of staff. The Chief Secretary for Administration Eric Chan said the Hong Kong government raised "strong objection to the association for its inability" to prevent the mistake from happening. Chief Executive John Lee said that the "song that was played was closely connected to the 2019 violence and disturbances, and advocacy for Hong Kong's independence," and said that the Organised Crime and Triad Bureau would investigate the matter. For similar incidents, see a list of wrong anthems incidents.

See also
 2022 Asia Rugby Women's Sevens Series

References

External links 
 Asia Rugby Sevens Trophy
 Results (Archived)
 Table (Archived)
 Knockout (Archived)
 Statistics (Archived)
 Asia Rugby Sevens Series - Thailand 7s
 Results (Archived)
 Table (Archived)
 Knockout) (Archived)
 Statistics) (Archived)

Asian Seven Series
2022 rugby sevens competitions
2022 in Asian rugby union